Atunatche Creek is a small river in the Hart Ranges of the Northern Rockies of British Columbia.

Atunatche Creek adopted 2 September 1954 on 93 O, as labelled on BC map 3C, 1923. Had been labelled "Tillicum Creek" on BC map 3E, 1922. "Atunatche Creek (not Tillicum)" identified in 1930 BC Gazetteer. Origin/significance not known.

Tributaries 

Declier Creek

References 

Rivers of the Canadian Rockies
Rivers of British Columbia